Casta e pura (internationally released as Chaste and Pure) is a 1981 Italian erotic-comedy film directed by Salvatore Samperi.

Cast 

Laura Antonelli: Rosa
Fernando Rey: Antonio		
Massimo Ranieri: Fernando	
Enzo Cannavale: Bottazzi, the priest
Christian De Sica: Carletto Morosini
Valeria Fabrizi: second wife of Bottesini
Riccardo Billi: father of Caletto
Vincenzo Crocitti: Picci
Sergio Di Pinto: Gustavo Bottesini
Gabrielle Lazure: Lisetta
Diego Cappuccio: Dario Di Maggio
Jean-Marc Bory 
Elsa Vazzoler  
Luis Ciges

References

External links

1981 films
1980s sex comedy films
Films directed by Salvatore Samperi
Commedia sexy all'italiana
1981 comedy films
1980s Italian-language films
1980s Italian films